Responder may refer to the following:

 Certified first responder, a person who has received certification in providing pre-hospital care during emergencies
 Certified First Responder in France
 Community first responder, a local area first responder
 Second responder, a worker who operates during recovery following manmade and natural disasters
 The Responder, a British police drama series set in Liverpool,
 Wilderness First Responder, an expert who is trained to respond to emergency situations in remote settings